John William Morris, Baron Morris of Borth-y-Gest,  (11 September 1896 – 9 June 1979) was a judge in England and Wales. He was a Law Lord from 1960 to 1975.

Early life
Morris was born in Liverpool, where his father was a bank manager. He was educated at the Liverpool Institute, but left school on the outbreak of the First World War in 1914 to join the Royal Welsh Fusiliers. He was granted a commission as a temporary second lieutenant (on probation) on 8 January 1916. He served in the British Army until 1918, reaching the rank of captain, and was awarded a Military Cross in January 1919.

After he was demobilised, he studied law at Trinity Hall, Cambridge, where he was President of the Cambridge Union Society in 1919. He graduated with an LLB in 1920, and won a Joseph Hodges Choate fellowship to study for one year at Harvard.

Legal career
Morris was called to the Bar at Inner Temple in 1921, and joined the Northern Circuit, where he became successful due to his skilful oratory. He was the Liberal Party candidate for Ilford at the 1923 and 1924 general elections, but failed to be elected, coming second and then third behind the incumbent Conservative MP Sir Fredric Wise.

He became a King's Counsel in 1935, and moved to London. He was also Judge of Appeal in the Isle of Man from 1938 to 1947 – the youngest ever to hold such position. He was the chairman of the quarter sessions in Caernarvonshire for 25 years. He became a bencher at Inner Temple in 1943, and served as treasurer in 1967. He became an honorary fellow at Trinity Hall in 1951.

Morris became a High Court judge in 1945, joining the King's Bench Division and receiving the customary knighthood. He was also appointed a Commander of the Order of the British Empire. He became Lord Justice of Appeal in 1951, and also joined the Privy Council. On 7 January 1960, he was appointed Lord of Appeal in Ordinary and was made additionally a life peer with the title Baron Morris of Borth-y-Gest, of Borth-y-Gest in the county of Caernarvonshire. When he retired as Lord of Appeal in 1975, he became a member of the Order of the Companions of Honour.

Although he was born in Liverpool, he was proud of his Welsh descent, and was Pro-Chancellor of the University of Wales from 1956 to 1974. He was not fluent in the Welsh language, but he was a member of the Gorsedd of Bards, and served as vice-president of the Honourable Society of Cymmrodorion. After his retirement from judicial office, he spoke in favour of Welsh devolution in debates on the Wales Act 1978.

He died in Porthmadog, close to Borth-y-Gest where he owned a house. It had been his wish to marry Lady Megan Lyon George but it was not to be.

Selected judgments
In Shaw v DPP (1961) UKHL 1, handed down on 4 May 1961, the appellant's conviction for the common law offence of conspiracy to corrupt public morals was upheld by the House of Lords. In his opinion, Morris said:

References

 Edmund-Davies, 'Morris, John William, Baron Morris of Borth-y-Gest (1896–1979)’, rev. Oxford Dictionary of National Biography, Oxford University Press, 2004; online edn, Jan 2008 accessed 8 April 2014

External links
 Parliamentary Archives, Papers of John William Morris, Baron Morris of Borth-y-Gest, 1896-1979

1896 births
1979 deaths
Royal Welch Fusiliers officers
British Army personnel of World War I
Welsh Congregationalists
People educated at Liverpool Institute High School for Boys
Alumni of Trinity Hall, Cambridge
Presidents of the Cambridge Union
Harvard University alumni
Liberal Party (UK) parliamentary candidates
Morris of Borth-y-Gest
Members of the Privy Council of the United Kingdom
Members of the Order of the Companions of Honour
Recipients of the Military Cross
Members of the Judicial Committee of the Privy Council
Knights Bachelor
Commanders of the Order of the British Empire